The mayoral election of 1993 in Pittsburgh, Pennsylvania was held on Tuesday, November 2, 1993. The incumbent mayor, Sophie Masloff of the Democratic Party chose not to run for re-election.

Democratic primary

State Representative Tom Murphy, who had finished in second to Masloff during the previous election cycle's Democratic primary won the party's nomination, defeating City Councilman (and future Pennsylvania Auditor General) Jack Wagner. Murphy had been well regarded for his work in the legislature for projects designed to improve the unity and community feel of city neighborhoods. However, he also gain a reputation as being difficult to work with. Nonetheless, his previous run for mayor had laid a strong foundation for a primary win.

General Election

A total of 86,414 votes were cast. Although Murphy won by a large margin, as is typical of Pittsburgh Democrats, he lost the city's black vote. City Councilman Duane Darkins, an activist for the short lived black progressive movement The Campaign for a New Tomorrow, ran on the platform of giving a voice to the city's minorities. Kathy Matta, a nonprofit director, was the Republican nominee.

References

1993 Pennsylvania elections
1993
1993 United States mayoral elections
1990s in Pittsburgh
November 1993 events in the United States